Dr. Santos station, also called as Sucat station is an under-construction Manila Light Rail Transit (LRT) station situated on Line 1. It is part of the Line 1 South Extension Project. The station would be located in between Dr. Santos Avenue, C-5 Southlink Expressway and C-5 Extension in Parañaque, a few hundred meters behind SM City Sucat.

History
The extension will have 8 passenger stations with an option for 2 future stations (Manuyo Uno and Talaba). The project was first approved on August 25, 2000 and the implementing agreement for the project was approved on January 22, 2002. However, construction for the extension was repeatedly delayed until the project was shelved years later.

The plans for the southern extension project were restarted as early as 2012 during the Aquino administration and was expected to begin construction in 2014, but was delayed due to right of way issues. The issues were resolved in 2016 and the project broke ground on May 4, 2017. Meanwhile, construction works on the south extension began on May 7, 2019 after the right-of-way acquisitions were cleared.

, the project is 75.3% complete; the station itself is 48% complete, with a planned opening by September 2024, and full operations by second quarter of 2027.

See also
List of Manila LRT and MRT stations
Manila Light Rail Transit System

References

Manila Light Rail Transit System stations
Proposed railway stations in the Philippines